A vorton is a hypothetical circular cosmic string loop stabilized by the angular momentum of the charge and current trapped on the string.

References

Further reading
 

Physical cosmology
Large-scale structure of the cosmos
String theory